Sirsi Marikamba Temple is a Hindu temple dedicated to Marikamba Devi ( Durga Devi ), located in Sirsi, Karnataka, It is also known as Marigudi, It was built in 1688, Sirsi Shri Marikamba Devi is "elder sister" of all Marikamba Devi's in Karnataka.

Features
The temple's façade, a 19th-century addition, is painted blue. After one enters through the façade, there is courtyard in the middle, which has cloisters surrounding it. The cloisters are filled with images of deities from the Hindu epics. The changes made inside the temple have hidden any evidence of older structures. The sanctum sanctorum has the central image of a fierce form of the goddess Durga, multi-armed (eight shoulders), riding a tiger and killing a demon. It is believed that the  image was retrieved from a pond on the road to Hangal. The temple has very special paintings of murals in Kaavi art, an art form which was popular in the coastal Konkan region of Karnataka. In this art form, now extinct, the top plastered layer of the mural was first dyed with a red pigment, which when removed revealed a lower white layer of plaster over which the murals were created.

Worship

The main priest at the temple belongs to the carpenter, or Vishvakarma, caste. Kanakadasa, a famous saint poet of the Bhakti movement, had visited the temple and advised the people to stop animal sacrifice of the he-buffalo. When Mahatma Gandhi visited Sirsi in 1934, during his campaign to abolish untouchability of Dalits, he refused to visit the temple, as animal sacrifice was a prevalent ancient practice at the temple; the sacrifice was in the form of offering of he-buffalo as a sacrifice to appease the goddess. A he-buffalo was specially bred for offering as a sacrifice to the deity during the annual Rathayatra. Following the protest by Gandhi, there was a social movement in the town not only to abolish animal sacrifice but also to allow Dalits entry into the temple. This movement was spearheaded by Keshwain, chief trustee of the temple, in association with Vitthal Rao Hodike, a teacher and dedicated Gandhian of the town. Both objectives of the movement were fulfilled.

Jaatre

The Sirsi Marikamba jaatre (chariot procession) of the deity is held every alternate year in the month of March and taken through the town. It is attended by a very large number of devotees. It is also most famous and biggest fair (jaatre) of the South India. Devotees from all around the state participate in this enormous event indulging themselves in the procession. Amusements for children, circuses, variety of shops, dramas and plays and many such things are set up for the people. It depicts the story of the goddess killing mahishasura.

Gallery

See also
 Marikamba Temple, Sagara
 Chamundeshwari Temple, Mysore
 Mookambika Temple, Kollur
 Annapurneshwari Temple, Horanadu
 Yellamma Temple, Saundatti

References

External links
 www.marikamba.com

Hindu temples in Uttara Kannada district
Religious buildings and structures completed in 1688
Durga temples
Devi temples in Karnataka
Tourism in Karnataka
1688 establishments in Asia